1st-seeded Ivo Minář won in the final 6–4, 6–3, against Florian Mayer.

Seeds

Draw

Final four

Top half

Bottom half

References
Main Draw
Qualifying Draw

Zagorka Cup